This is the list of tourist attractions in Kelantan, Malaysia.

Museums
 Museum of Royal Traditions and Customs Istana Jahar
 Istana Batu Royal Museum
 Kelantan Islamic Museum
 Kelantan Museum

Religious places
 Kampung Laut Mosque
 Sultan Ismail Petra Silver Jubilee Mosque
 Wat Machimmaram
 Wat Phothivihan
 Wat Uttamaram
 Tokong Swee Nyet Keung (Tokong Mek)
 Masjid Muhammadi

Shopping centers
 Siti Khadijah Market

Sport venues
 Sultan Mohammad IV Stadium

See also
 List of tourist attractions in Malaysia

References

 
Tourism in Malaysia
Kelantan